Ram Shankar may refer to:
 Ram Shankar Katheria, Indian politician
 Ram Shankar Misra, professor of religion
 Ram Shankar Tripathi, Indian scholar of Buddhism
 Ram Shankar (bowls)